Al-Shabaka, The Palestinian Policy Network is an independent, transnational think tank, whose mission is “to educate and foster public debate on Palestinian human rights and self-determination within the framework of international law.”

History 
Al-Shabaka was launched in 2010, and was described as "Palestine’s first independent think tank." Al-Shabaka was registered in California in 2009 as the Middle East Policy Network, doing business as Al-Shabaka: The Palestinian Policy Network, and granted 501(c)(3) by the US Internal Revenue Service in 2013.

According to Cherine Hussein, an academic based at the Swedish Institute for International Affairs, Al-Shabaka’s launch was a "significant initiative” by “[Palestinian] intellectuals." and was launched “to put a stronger Palestinian policy voice on the map”. Its work "is primarily directed to concerned Palestinians as well as Arab and international policy communities." In a 2021 scholarly literature review, anthropologist Sa'ed Atshan cites Al-Shabaka as a "potential future addition" to the "ecosystem" of anthropology of Palestine.

People 
Columbia University-based historian Rashid Khalidi, writer and playwright Samah Sabawi, legal scholar Noura Erakat, and author Laila el-Haddad.

Recognition 
Al-Shabaka has appeared in Global Go To Think Tank Index Report, produced by The Think Tanks and Civil Societies Program (TTCSP) of the Lauder Institute at the University of Pennsylvania, from 2013–2020. Al-Shabaka has ranked between 35th – 33rd out of 85 in ‘Best Think Tank Network’.

References

External links 
 

Think tanks